Matt Richards may refer to:

 Matt Richards (filmmaker) (born 1967), English film and television producer, director and writer
 Matt Richards (footballer, born 1984), English football player for Ipswich, Brighton, Walsall, Shrewsbury and Cheltenham
 Matt Richards (footballer, born 1989), English football player for Notts County
 Matt Richards (swimmer) (born 2002), British swimmer